Maxwell Perry Cotton (born May 7, 2000) is an American actor who portrayed Cooper Whedon in the television series Brothers & Sisters.

Life and career
Cotton was born on May 7, 2000 in San Diego, California. Cotton graduated from Notre Dame High School.His younger brother, Mason Vale Cotton, is also an actor.

Cotton began acting at the age of six. His first ever role began in 2006, on the television series Brothers and Sisters, as Cooper Whedon. That same year, he played Zeke in the television movie Welcome to the Jungle Gym. 

His first film was A Dennis the Menace Christmas in which he played Dennis Mitchell. In 2009, Cotton appeared in the movie Like Dandelion Dust. In 2010, he appeared in Radio Free Albemuth. In 2011, he appeared in Mr. Popper's Penguins as Billy Popper. In 2013, he played young Max (Max being played by Matt Damon) in Elysium. He voiced a Civil War-era teenager, Albertus McCreery, in the documentary film The Gettysburg Address.

References

External links

2000 births
21st-century American male actors
American male child actors
American male film actors
American male television actors
Living people
Male actors from San Diego
Notre Dame High School (Sherman Oaks, California) alumni